David Francis Manders (born February 20, 1941) is a retired American football center in the National Football League from 1964 through 1974.  He played college football at Michigan State University. He graduated from Kingsford High School and played in two Super Bowls with the Dallas Cowboys, winning one.

Early years
Dave Manders played football at Kingsford High School, where he was named all-state and lineman of the year as a senior. He also set an Upper Peninsula of Michigan shot put record. His number 51 is only one of three numbers retired by the school, along with Dick Berlinski, who also played football at Michigan State, and Tim Kearney.

In 1980, he was inducted into the Upper Peninsula Sports Hall of Fame.

College career
Manders went on to play at Michigan State University in 1959, where he was a two-way player, playing center on offense and linebacker on defense.

During his college career, he was among the team leaders in tackles, even though he experienced leg injuries in his last two years. As a sophomore, he was a third-team All-Big Ten selection and became an All-American honorable mention after his senior year.

Professional career
Manders was signed by the Dallas Cowboys as a rookie undrafted free agent in 1962 to play linebacker, but quit the team during rookie camp after just three days.

After spending 1963 playing semi-pro football in the United Football League for the Toledo Tornadoes, Manders called the Cowboys front office and asked for another chance, he signed in December 1963 and made the team the next year as a center.

Nicknamed "Dog" by his teammates, he was quick, strong and had huge legs. He was always considered to be one of the hardest-working players on the team. In 1965 his second season in the NFL, he became the Cowboys starting center replacing Mike Connelly.

In 1966 he became the first franchise offensive lineman named to the Pro Bowl. In 1967 during pre-season, he suffered a career-threatening right knee injury and missed the entire season, upon his return he served as a backup to Mike Connelly and Malcolm Walker, until he returned to form and took his job back in 1970.

He was a starter in the Cowboys first Super Bowl–Super Bowl V, held in Miami on January 17 1971 against the Baltimore Colts. He was also involved in one of the game's controversial plays, when the Cowboys Duane Thomas fumbled the ball on the Colts two-yard line, and although Manders recovered the ball, the officials still awarded it to the Colts, who won their first Super Bowl as Jim O'Brien kicked a 32-yard field goal with time running out for a 16-13 victory.

He was the starter in the Cowboys first championship team in franchise history, that won Super Bowl VI in 1972. In 1973, he retired due to a contract dispute, but by the month of September, he was back working out with the team. He played in the majority of games during that season, although John Fitzgerald was the starter at center for the Cowboys. He continued splitting time with Fitzgerald until his retirement at the end of the 1974 season.

Manders was a captain and a key component in a Cowboys offensive line that dominated the NFL for a decade and won 2 NFC Championships and 1 Super Bowl.

References

1941 births
Living people
American football offensive linemen
Dallas Cowboys players
Michigan State Spartans football players
United Football League (1961–1964) players
Eastern Conference Pro Bowl players
Players of American football from Milwaukee